Iñigo Landaluze Intxaurraga (born May 9, 1977 in Getxo, Basque Country) is a Spanish former professional road bicycle racer, who rode professionally between 2001 and 2009, entirely for the  team. During the 2009 season, Landaluze tested positive for the use of Continuous erythropoietin receptor activator (CERA) at the 2009 Critérium du Dauphiné Libéré. He received a two-year ban for this, and was disqualified from his results at the race.

Doping
In 2005 Landaluze made his breakthrough by winning the 2005 Critérium du Dauphiné Libéré. However his win was clouded in controversy as it was soon announced he had tested positive for abnormally high testosterone and was suspended from racing until his case was heard out. In 2006, however, he was cleared to return to racing after he showed that the lab conducting tests committed procedural errors. The UCI then failed to show that those errors did not affect the outcome of the tests. The CAS panel reviewing the case said that it was "probable" that Landaluze had committed a doping violation, but the UCI had failed to meet its burden of proof in the case. New revisions to the WADA Code would suggest that Landaluze would have lost his case under the new rules.

Iñigo Landaluze was provisionally suspended by the Union Cycliste Internationale on July 17, 2009 after testing positive for the banned blood booster CERA at the 2009 Critérium du Dauphiné Libéré.

Major results 

2001
 5th Overall Tour de Picardie
 6th Circuito de Getxo
2002
 5th Clásica de Almería
2003
 5th Trofeo Luis Puig
 7th Clásica a los Puertos de Guadarrama
2004
 7th Overall Vuelta a Andalucía
 7th Classique des Alpes
 10th Overall Critérium du Dauphiné Libéré
 10th Trofeo Manacor
2005
 1st  Overall Critérium du Dauphiné Libéré
2007
 8th Clásica de San Sebastián
2008
 2nd Overall Vuelta a Burgos
 5th Clásica a los Puertos de Guadarrama
 6th Overall Vuelta a la Comunidad de Madrid

See also
 List of doping cases in cycling

References

External links 

 Rider profile

1977 births
Living people
Sportspeople from Getxo
Cyclists from the Basque Country (autonomous community)
Spanish male cyclists
Doping cases in cycling
Sportspeople from Biscay